The men's K-4 1000 metres event was a fours kayaking event conducted as part of the Canoeing at the 1996 Summer Olympics program.

Medalists

Results

Heats
16 crews entered in two heats. The top two finishers in each heat advanced to the final while the remaining teams competed in the repechages.

Semifinals
The top two finishers in the each semifinal and the fastest third-place finisher advanced to the final.

Final
The final was held on August 3.

Germany stayed close to Hungary for the first 750 meters of the race before pulling away to win decisively.

References
1996 Summer Olympics official report Volume 3. p. 171. 
Sports-reference.com 1996 K-4 1000 m results.
Wallechinsky, David and Jaime Loucky (2008). "Canoeing: Men's Kayak Fours 1000 Meters". In The Complete Book of the Olympics: 2008 Edition. London: Aurum Press Limited. p. 478.

Men's K-4 1000
Men's events at the 1996 Summer Olympics